The University of Toronto Homophile Association (UTHA) was Canada's first gay and lesbian student organization. Founded in 1969, the UTHA paved the way for similar student groups across the province of Ontario and led to the establishment of the Community Homophile Association of Toronto (CHAT).

History 
Founded in 1969, the University of Toronto Homophile Association served as Canada’s first gay and lesbian student group. The UTHA held its first official public gathering at University College on November 4, 1969. Within a month, the UTHA registered under the University of Toronto’s Student Administrative Council and became an official student organization.

The UTHA's office was located at 12 Hart House Circle and regular meetings would be held in the Graduate Student's Union. By the end of 1969, the UTHA had 45 members. The group’s early members included Jearld Moldenhauer, Bill McRay, Ian Young, Charlie Hill, and Disa Rosen. Charlie Hill was appointed as the UTHA’s first chairman, who was eventually succeeded by Ian Young.

Soon after the UTHA was established, it became apparent that the organization had wider appeal and interest from the queer members outside of the university community. This need for a queer Toronto based community group eventually led to the founding of the Community Homophile Association of Toronto in 1971. The University of Toronto's queer student organization LGBTOUT traces its roots to UTHA.

Activities 
The University of Toronto Homophile Association's activities centered around educating the community about homosexuality, combatting legal discrimination against homosexuality, and bringing about social and personal acceptance towards homosexuality. The group's activities included weekly discussion groups, public forums with invited guests, high school speaking engagements, an informal counselling service, research, political advocacy, referral services and social events.

The UTHA speakers included guests: Dr. Franklin Kameny, the President of the Washington Mattachine Society, Thomas Szasz, Michael Lynch, English Buddhist philosopher Scott Symons, D.E. Harding, Dr. Persasd of the Ontario Department of Health and playwright John Herbert. Members of the UTHA also gave talks on homosexuality to student groups, high schools and more. The UTHA offered informal counselling services run by volunteers, which would deal with personal, psychological, religious, social and legal questions. The association also hosted dances on and off campus.

References

University of Toronto
Ontario students' associations